Dodi Irawan (born 7 May 2003) is an Indonesian professional footballer who plays as a centre back for Liga 1 club Bhayangkara.

Club career

Bhayangkara
He was signed for Bhayangkara to play in Liga 1 in the 2021 season. Dodi made his professional debut on 20 March 2022 in a match against Persela Lamongan at the Kapten I Wayan Dipta Stadium, Gianyar.

Career statistics

Club

Notes

References

External links
 Dodi Irawan at Soccerway
 Dodi Irawan at Liga Indonesia

2003 births
Living people
Indonesian footballers
Liga 1 (Indonesia) players
Liga 2 (Indonesia) players
Bhayangkara F.C. players
PSMS Medan players
Association football defenders
People from Bandar Lampung
Sportspeople from Lampung